Masterclass is an American documentary television series airing on HBO. Each half-hour episode documents the experience of a small group of young artists working with a famous mentor. The series premiered on HBO on April 18, 2010, with opera star Plácido Domingo working with three aspiring young singers.

The students in the program are chosen from participants in the Miami-based organization, YoungArts, a program of the National Foundation for Advancement in the Arts, which supports emerging artists. The series is produced and directed by Karen Goodman and Kirk Simon of the Simon & Goodman Picture Company. The Executive Producer is Lin Arison.

Episodes

Season 1 (2010)

Season 2 (2012–13)

Season 3 (2013–14)

Awards

Primetime Emmy Awards

References

External links
Masterclass on HBO (official website)
Masterclass on Simon & Goodman Picture Company (official website)

HBO original programming
2010 American television series debuts
2010s American documentary television series
English-language television shows